LRoc (born James Elbert Phillips) is an American in-house songwriter and producer at Jermaine Dupri's So So Def Recordings. He has co-written and co-produced singles like Janet Jackson's "Call on Me", Monica's "Everytime Tha Beat Drop", Mariah Carey's "Get Your Number", Murphy Lee's "Wat Dat Hook Gon' Be", Usher's "Yeah!", LL Cool J's "Control Myself," and Nelly's "Grillz". He produced Teairra Mari's single "Sponsor" in 2010.

External links
Starpoynt Magazine:  "LRoc-in' To The Top!"
Atlanta Daily World (July 9, 2006):  "Atlanta's LROC Creates Beats For Top-Selling CDs, Works On Project To Benefit AIDS Research"
EMI Music Publishing:   "Artist Profile - LRoc"

American male songwriters
American record producers
Living people
Year of birth missing (living people)